James Whelan (born 11 July 1996) is an Australian professional road racing cyclist, who currently rides for UCI Continental team . In October 2020, he was named in the startlist for the 2020 Giro d'Italia.

Major results
2017
 3rd Overall Tour of Tasmania
2018
 1st  Road race, Oceania Under–23 Road Championships
 1st Ronde van Vlaanderen Beloften
 2nd Road race, Oceania Road Championships
 2nd Road race, National Under–23 Road Championships
2022
 1st Overall Santos Festival of Cycling
 1st Stage 1 
 2nd Road race, National Road Championships

Grand Tour general classification results timeline

References

External links

1996 births
Living people
Australian male cyclists
Cyclists from Melbourne